There are multiple mosques named some variation of Al Khair Mosque:
Al Khair Mosque, Sana'a, Yemen
Al Khair Mosque, Singapore, has a capacity of 3300 worshipers